The Shire of Dardanup is a local government area in the South West region of Western Australia, immediately to the east and southeast of the City of Bunbury and about  south of the state capital, Perth.

History
The Dardanup Road District was gazetted on 14 December 1894. On 1 July 1961, it became a shire following the passage of the Local Government Act 1960, which reformed all remaining road districts into shires.

Wards
The Shire is no longer divided into wards and the nine councillors sit at large.

Towns and localities
The towns and localities of the Shire of Dardanup with population and size figures based on the most recent Australian census:

Notable councillors
 Les Craig, Dardanup Road Board member 1928–1951, chairman 1947–1951; also a state MP

Heritage-listed places

As of 2023, 60 places are heritage-listed in the Shire of Dardanup, of which four are on the State Register of Heritage Places.

References

External links
 

Dardanup